Dzhelga is a rural locality (a settlement) in Gorod Akhtubinsk, Akhtubinsky District, Astrakhan Oblast, Russia. The population was 37 as of 2010. There are 11 streets.

Geography 
Dzhelga is located 9 km southeast of Akhtubinsk (the district's administrative centre) by road. Akhtubinsk is the nearest rural locality.

References 

Rural localities in Akhtubinsky District